The 1978 Toray Sillook Open was a women's singles tennis tournament played on indoor carpet courts at Yoyogi National Gymnasium in Tokyo in Japan. The event was part of the AAA category of the 1978 Colgate Series. It was the sixth edition of the tournament and was held from 14 September through 17 September 1978. First-seeded Virginia Wade won the title and earned $20,000 first-prize money.

Finals

Singles
 Virginia Wade defeated  Betty Stöve 6–4, 7–6(7–2)
It was Wade's 2nd title of the year and the 54th of her career.

Prize money

Notes

References

External links
 International Tennis Federation (ITF) tournament details

Toray Sillook Open
Pan Pacific Open
Toray Sillook Open
Toray Sillook Open
Toray Sillook Open
Toray Sillook Open